The Zel'dovich number is a dimensionless number which provides a quantitative measure for the activation energy of a chemical reaction which appears in the Arrhenius exponent, named after the Russian scientist Yakov Borisovich Zel'dovich, who along with David A. Frank-Kamenetskii, first introduced in their paper in 1938. In 1983 ICDERS meeting at Poitiers, it was decided to name after Zel'dovich.

It is defined as

where 
 is the activation energy of the reaction
 is the universal gas constant
 is the burnt gas temperature
 is the unburnt mixture temperature.

In terms of heat release parameter , it is given by

For typical combustion phenomena, the value for Zel'dovich number lies in the range . Activation energy asymptotics uses this number as the large parameter of expansion.

References

Chemical kinetics
Combustion
Dimensionless numbers of fluid mechanics
Fluid dynamics
Dimensionless numbers
Dimensionless numbers of chemistry